This is a list of mountains in Catalonia, Spain.

See also
Montserrat
List of mountains in Aragon

References

Catalonia
 
Mountains